Michael M. Kaback, M.D. is a geneticist, physician, and Professor of Pediatrics and Reproductive Medicine, and chief of the Division of Medical Genetics, at the University of California–San Diego.

He is best known for his role in the discovery and development of an enzyme assay method of screening for Tay–Sachs disease, a rare and fatal genetic disorder. This test allowed for cost-effective screening of large populations, the first such test in medical genetics. Because no large scale genetic screening had ever been done before, Kaback became involved in public health aspects of screening, including the education of target populations and genetic counseling.  Although no cure for Tay–Sachs disease has been found, antenatal genetic screening has virtually  eliminated the disease in the Ashkenazi Jewish population in both the United States and Israel.

In 1979, Kaback served on the first National Institutes of Health (NIH) panel to recommend antenatal diagnosis in cases where a couple might be at risk for conceiving a child with a hereditary disease or congenital defect. The panel brought together physicians, scientists, consumers, and others in order to develop a consensus statement for use by health care providers. In the NIH Consensus Development Program, panel members are selected for their expertise to serve as judges of evidence, and must have no prior conflicts of interest.  Panel members addressed issues concerning the relative risks and benefits of genetic screening, including the costs and risks of the screening procedures themselves. It was the first NIH panel to provide recommendations for genetic screening, and its findings have since been revised many times.

See also
 Tay–Sachs disease

References

Selected publications
 Robert J. Desnick and Michael M. Kaback (editors). Tay Sachs Disease. Academic Press, 2001. .
 Kaback, Michael M. (2001). "The 'Asilomar Process' and the Human Genome Project." Perspectives in Biology and Medicine Vol 44:2. Johns Hopkins University Press. pp. 230–234.
 Kaback, Michael M. (1993) et al. "Tay Sachs Disease — Carrier Screening, Prenatal Diagnosis, and the Molecular Era: An International Perspective, 1970 to 1993." Journal of the American Medical Association Vol 270:19 pp. 2307–2315.

University of California, San Diego faculty
American geneticists
Living people
Year of birth missing (living people)
Members of the National Academy of Medicine